Felicity Campbell (born 23 April 1974) is an Australian short track speed skater. She competed in the women's 500 metres event at the 1992 Winter Olympics.

References

External links
 

1974 births
Living people
Australian female short track speed skaters
Olympic short track speed skaters of Australia
Short track speed skaters at the 1992 Winter Olympics
Sportspeople from Sydney
20th-century Australian women